IC 2602 (also known as the Southern Pleiades, Theta Carinae Cluster, or Caldwell 102) is an open cluster in the constellation Carina. Discovered by Abbe Lacaille in 1751 from South Africa, the cluster is easily visible to the unaided eye, and is one of the nearest star clusters, centred about 149 parsecs (486 light-years) away from Earth.

Description
IC 2602 has a total apparent magnitude of 1.9, and contains about 75 stars. It is the third-brightest open cluster in the sky, following the Hyades and the Pleiades. Its apparent diameter is about 50 arcminutes.

IC 2602 is likely about the same age as the open cluster IC 2391, which has a lithium depletion boundary age of 50 million years old, though the age estimated from its Hertzsprung-Russell diagram is about 13.7 million years. IC 2602 is thought to form  part of the Lower Scorpius–Centaurus association.

Components 
Theta Carinae is the brightest star within the open cluster, with the apparent visual magnitude of +2.74. Theta Carinae is part of the asterism known as the Diamond Cross, which is often mistaken for the Southern Cross asterism in the constellation of Crux.

p Carinae (PP Carinae) is another third-magnitude star known to be a member of IC 2602, although it lies well outside the main visible grouping of stars. p Carinae exhibits a variable apparent magnitude ranging from 3.22 to 3.55.

All other members the cluster are of the fifth magnitude and fainter, but several are naked-eye objects, including HR 4196 (V518 Car), HR 4204, HD 93194, HR 4219, HR 4220, HR 4222, HD 92536, HD 93738, and V364 Carinae.

History 
IC 2602 was first discovered by French astronomer and abbot Nicolas-Louis de Lacaille on March 3, 1751 while in Cape of Good Hope, South Africa. In Lacaille's initial discovery, he classified Theta Carinae (referred as "Theta Navis", or alternatively "Theta Argus") as a third magnitude star, whilst citing the cluster's resemblance to the northern Pleiades.

Observation 
Positioned at a declination of -64º on the night sky, IC 2602 is most clearly visible from the southern hemisphere, and appears circumpolar from southern subtropics and temperate climates; the cluster is observable from a limited selection of north hemispherical regions, mainly tropical areas. IC 2602 is identifiable a few degrees south of the southern Milky Way, surrounded by various fifth and sixth magnitude stars. To the unaided eye, several faint stars are distinguishable to the east of the blue Theta Carinae.

Notes

References

External links 

 The Southern Pleaides @ SEDS IC objects pages
 Image Southern Pleiades(IC 2602)

 
Carina (constellation)
Open clusters
102b
?